Javad Etaat (born 20 April 1963 in Darab County, Shiraz) is an Iranian politician and professor at Shahid Beheshti University.

References

1963 births
Living people
People from Shiraz
Members of the 6th Islamic Consultative Assembly
National Trust Party (Iran) politicians
Islamic Association of University Instructors politicians
Islamic Iran Participation Front politicians